"Cold One" is a song by Eric Church.

Cold One or variation, may refer also to:

 Cold Ones, a 2007 U.S. film
 "Cold.1" (song), a 2012 song by 'GOOD Music' off the album Cruel Summer (GOOD Music album)
 Cold Ones, an Australian comedy podcast/YouTube channel hosted by Max Stanley (maxmoefoe) and Chad Roberts (anything4views)
 fictional monster from the Warhammer Fantasy game, used as mounts by the Lizardmen and Dark Elves
 name for the vampires that appear in Stephenie Meyer's the Twilight saga series
 race of ice spirits that appear in some stories by Clark Ashton Smith, including "The Light from the Pole"
 slang term for beer or any chilled alcoholic beverage

See also

 Cold (disambiguation)
 One (disambiguation)